Parasegetibacter terrae is a Gram-negative, variably shaped and aerobic bacterium from the genus of Parasegetibacter which has been isolated from paddy soil from Suwon in Korea.

References

Sphingobacteriia
Bacteria described in 2015